M. Bison, also known as the Vega (in Japan), is a fictional character created by Capcom. First introduced in Street Fighter II: The World Warrior, he is a recurring character in the Street Fighter series of fighting games, acting as one of the series' main antagonists.

A would-be world dictator and megalomaniac, M. Bison's ultimate ambition is to control the world's governments through his covert crime syndicate, . He hosts Street Fighter IIs fighting tournament and is the last opponent fought in the game. Throughout the series, several characters—including Ryu, Guile, T. Hawk, Cammy, Rose and Chun-Li—have their personal vendettas against M. Bison and have entered the tournament in the hopes of facing him personally. M. Bison wields an inherently evil energy known as "Psycho Power", in contrast to Ryu and Ken's "Hadou".

Despite not appearing until the release of Street Fighter II, Bison is widely considered to be the true main antagonist of the Street Fighter series, having filled the role in the Street Fighter II and Street Fighter Alpha series and Street Fighter V and acting as the force behind the events of the Street Fighter IV series, where the main villain, Seth, is revealed to have been Bison's unwitting pawn all along.

In a variety of media, Bison has been portrayed by Raul Julia, Neal McDonough and Silvio Simac and voiced by Tom Wyner, Richard Newman and Gerald C. Rivers. Julia was nominated for a posthumous Saturn Award for Best Supporting Actor for his performance.

Conception and development
In Japan, the character is named , derived from the star of the same name. However, during localization of Street Fighter II for the English language market, Capcom's North American branch felt that the name did not sound threatening enough to North American audiences for the game's final boss, and thus was more suitable for the Spanish cage fighter. At this same time, another concern arose that the name of another character, Mike Bison, conceived as a parody of real-life boxer Mike Tyson, would be a legal liability for Capcom. As a result, the characters' names were changed, and the game's final boss was dubbed M. Bison for international appearances of the character. Though the "M" originally stood for "Mike" in Japan (for the boxer character), Capcom has never explained what it stands for in Western releases, calling it "part of the character's mystery". Regardless, Bison has been addressed as Master Bison in Street Fighter Alpha 3 repeatedly, as well as in the animated movie. In his introduction before a fight in (Super) Street Fighter IV, he refers to himself as "The Mighty Bison". In endings in Alpha 2, he is referred to by a henchman as Commander Bison. In Street Fighter V, he is referred to by F.A.N.G. as Lord Bison.

When developing Street Fighter II: The Animated Movie, it was decided to give him a more muscular appearance, rather than have him resemble "a middle aged man", while his face was modified to appear somewhat demonic. This appearance was later carried onto the Street Fighter Alpha series, featured as his original appearance before the Street Fighter II series.

The first source of inspiration for M. Bison's design came from the character General Washizaki, one of the main villains of the popular martial arts manga Riki-Oh. However the final realized concept (a shadowy mystic with a long, stony visage wearing 20th century East Asian military garb) is widely believed to be a homage to Yasunori Katō, the supernatural villain of the influential Teito Monogatari franchise.

Appearances

Street Fighter series
Bison first appears in Street Fighter II: The World Warrior as the final computer-controlled opponent in the single-player mode, following the player's defeat of the other three Grand Masters. The battle takes place at a temple in Bangkok, Thailand in front of several monks, where he poses with his cape, which he throws off prior to battle. He became a playable character from Champion Edition and onward, while maintaining his position as the final boss until Super Street Fighter II Turbo, in which a hidden character named Akuma defeats Bison and challenges the player as an alternate final boss, if certain gameplay conditions are met.

The storyline through the numerous versions of Street Fighter II characterizes Bison as the leader of a criminal organization called "Shadaloo" who sponsors the World Warrior tournament. A few characters who participate in the tournament have a personal vendetta against Bison. Chun-Li and Guile are both seeking to avenge the deaths of their loved ones (Chun-Li's father and Guile's best friend respectively), while T. Hawk wants to avenge both his homeland and his father, that were destroyed and devastated by the villain; the amnesiac Cammy, on the other hand, believes that Bison is connected to her past and learns in her ending that she was once one of his agents (changed to being lovers in the original English localization of the arcade, and then changed into being a DNA copy made for the purpose of impersonating him in the Game Boy Advance version).

Bison later appears in the Street Fighter Alpha trilogy, a prequel to the Street Fighter II series. In Street Fighter Alpha: Warriors' Dreams, Bison appears as the final boss for certain characters and a hidden playable character available via a code. Two characters with ties to Bison were introduced: Rose, a fortune teller with spiritual ties to Bison, whose Soul Power is the opposite of Bison's Psycho Power; and Charlie (Nash in Japan), Guile's deceased war buddy previously mentioned in Street Fighter II, who seeks to track him down. Bison, as he appears in the Alpha games, fights wearing a cape, and gains a teleport and a projectile move. Street Fighter Alpha 2, released the following year in 1996, follows the same plot as the original Alpha, but features completely revamped endings. Bison is featured in this game as a playable character without any cheat codes required. In Street Fighter Alpha 3, released in 1998, a powered-up version of M. Bison serves as the final boss of the game. He is the final boss for every character in the game except for Evil Ryu, whose final boss is Shin Akuma, and his final opponent is Ryu himself. Several revelations are made in this game, including the fact that Rose is the good half of Bison's soul and the fact that Cammy is a female clone of Bison. In the canonical story of Alpha 3, Bison is revealed to be dying due to the strain of Psycho Power on his body and the only thing keeping him alive is his Psycho drive, which brings him to search for Ryu, whose body he has deemed worthy of possession due to Ryu's struggles against the Dark Hadou, which Bison believes will sustain him. In the story, depicted in more than one ending, Bison fights Ryu and very nearly possesses him, but Ryu, with his memories of Rose, Akuma, Sakura, Chun-Li and Ken, is able to counter Bison's Psycho Power with his Hadou and ultimately overcomes the warlord, while Rose punches a hole in Bison's body. Before he can be destroyed, Bison transfers his soul into Rose's body, rendering her unconscious before his body disintegrates. Rose's body is recovered by Guy while Bison is presumed dead. Similar endings apply to the game's other characters.

Bison returns in Street Fighter IV, set between Street Fighter II and Street Fighter III. The Street Fighter IV Training Guide reveals that Bison was destroyed by Akuma's Shun Goku Satsu and now inhabits a new body created for him by his scientists. Unlike his previous bodies, this one is capable of withstanding the full strength of his Psycho Power. In Street Fighter IV, the main villain is Seth, an android previously created for Bison's soul to inhabit but went rogue and usurped the leadership of S.I.N., a subsidiary of Shadaloo. It is later revealed, however, that Bison is actually the true mastermind behind the game's events, and was secretly manipulating Seth to further his own agendas before revealing himself again. Ryu eventually destroys Seth once and for all, unknowingly allowing Bison to retake control of Shadaloo. Bison also appears in the sequels/updates, Super Street Fighter IV and Ultra Street Fighter IV.

Bison appears in Street Fighter V, set between IV and III, where he is depicted with grey hair.<ref>{{cite web|url=https://www.youtube.com/watch?v=epPou9RzeKM |archive-url=https://ghostarchive.org/varchive/youtube/20211221/epPou9RzeKM |archive-date=2021-12-21 |url-status=live|title= Street Fighter 5 - M. Bison Reveal Trailer |publisher=IGN |date=2015-05-19 |access-date=2015-05-19}}</ref> Shadaloo enacts a plan known as "Operation C.H.A.I.N.S." in which seven artificial satellites known as the "Black Moons" are constructed to cause various cities around the world to lose power, thereby creating commotion which fuels Bison's Psycho Power due to negative emotions. When the plan is ultimately foiled, a resurrected Charlie sacrifices himself to weaken Bison, leaving Ryu to fight him one last time. After a fierce battle, Ryu finishes Bison once and for all with the Power of Nothingness, and his body disintegrates as he laughs at the irony, leaving only his cap behind to be buried under crumbling Shadaloo base. After his death, Bison becomes Phantom Bison, a ghost empowered by Psycho Power.

Other games
Bison appears in Street Fighter: The Movie, a 1995 video game adaptation of the 1994 film. The game looks similar to early Mortal Kombat games, due to each character being represented by digitized sprites of the film's actors. Bison's portrayer, Raúl Juliá, had intended to participate in the project, but bowed out due to health problems. Consequently, Bison's fight animations were performed by Australian stuntman Darko Tuscan. Film clips of Juliá as Bison are included within the game's cutscenes.
In Street Fighter EX, Bison retains a projectile attack and teleport, and gains a new throw, which was later used in Street Fighter IV. In his ending in Street Fighter EX2 Plus, Bison develops an experimental drug called "SH-11". In Street Fighter EX3, he gains a tag-team super move when paired with Vega.
In the Marvel vs. Capcom series of crossover fighting games, Bison is frequently included among the ranks of Capcom characters. Both X-Men vs. Street Fighter (1996) and Marvel Super Heroes vs. Street Fighter (1997) feature Bison as a playable character. Bison's character sprite is identical to that of his Street Fighter Alpha incarnation, though he is constantly grinning. He is noticeably absent from Marvel vs. Capcom: Clash of Super Heroes (1998), though he appears in Chun-Li and Shadow Lady's ending sequences.Ending for Marvel vs Capcom - Shadow Lady (Arcade). VGMuseum. Retrieved on 2008-4-13. In Marvel vs. Capcom 2: New Age of Heroes (2000), the Alpha version of Bison is once again a playable character, though he must be unlocked. M. Bison does not appear in Marvel vs. Capcom 3: Fate of Two Worlds, but he is mentioned by Chun-Li in one of her win quotes, and in Ultimate Marvel vs. Capcom 3, one of Wesker's alternate colors is based on M. Bison's design. M. Bison also makes a cameo appearance in Dormammu's ending in UMVC3.
Bison reappears in the SNK vs. Capcom series, with an appearance that resembled his original Street Fighter II sprite instead of Alpha ones. He has regularly appeared in each entry of the series, beginning with SNK vs. Capcom: The Match of the Millennium (1999) and its sequels, Capcom vs. SNK Pro: Millennium Fight 2000 and Capcom vs. SNK 2 (2001). For SNK vs. Capcom Bison with Geese are the penultimate boss encounter or last battle if the player lost their rival battle that takes place before the tourney's final.

Bison appears at the halfway point for the Capcom vs SNK games as a mid-boss (along with Geese Howard) if the player has accumulated enough points. He has the psycho crusher as a standard attack and gains the kick throw from the EX series.

Bison also appears as a trading card in the handheld collectible card game SNK vs. Capcom: Card Fighters Clash (1999). Most recently, he was included as a playable character in SNK vs. Capcom: SVC Chaos (2003).
Bison appears in Capcom Fighting Jam (2004), which features an assortment of characters from each individual series published by Capcom. In the game, Bison is part of the Street Fighter II roster.
Bison also appears in the Japanese action/tactical RPG hybrid Namco × Capcom and Project X Zone 2.
Bison is also a playable character in Street Fighter X Tekken, with Juri as his official tag partner.

Alternate versions
In some versions of Street Fighter games, the player will face an alternate version of M. Bison, usually as a computer controlled opponent in the games single-player mode. In Street Fighter Alpha 3, a more powerful form of M. Bison with stronger abilities and fewer weaknesses appears as the final boss for every character except Evil Ryu, who fights Shin Akuma, and M. Bison himself, who fights Ryu. Should the player lose and not continue, an edited version of M. Bison's ending will play, and the game will end. There also are some minor differences with this form aside from damage output. His fierce punch attacks send out a wave of energy and his Psycho Crusher Super Combo fills the whole screen with a devastating streak of blue flames. This improved Psycho Crusher is much faster and stronger than its normal counterpart, cannot be blocked in the air, and inflicts severe damage even when blocked; it is the most powerful move in the game. The player is also able to choose this version of M. Bison as a 4th ISM, dubbed Shadaloo-ISM (or S-ISM), in the console versions of Street Fighter Alpha 3, by choosing Bison with the select button.

In Street Fighter EX2 Plus for the arcade and PlayStation, another version of Bison appears called "Bison II" (or "Vega II") as a secret final opponent in single-player mode. If the player defeats the regular version of Bison at the end, Bison will resurrect himself as Bison II and challenge the player. Bison II can be distinguished from the regular version of Bison by the white-colored outfit he wears back in EX2, and the background which changes to a colorful light stream coming out of the floor in a pure black room. In EX3 he sports a black uniform, gold plates, and has orange-tinted skin. Like Alpha 3 M. Bison, the player cannot continue after losing against Bison II in EX2.

In Street Fighter EX3, Bison II returns as a playable secret character. His move set is identical to that of his normal counterpart, with the exception of two additional Psycho Cannon attacks.

A third, computer-controlled only version of the character, known as "Shin-Bison" (or "True Vega"), is also included in EX3. Shin-Bison appears with pale, purple-tinted skin, blue-green plates, and a white uniform. In addition to an overall speed increase, he has an infinite amount of SC energy, the ability to cancel most of his attacks, and a new Knee Press Nightmare Meteor combo where he creates three copies of himself, one above and two beside him, which gives the move a massive range boost. This incarnation is considered to be his most formidable.

In the Street Fighter: The Movie home video game, a super-powered version of Bison serves as the final boss of the Movie Battle mode, but his only advantage is his super combo gauge being constantly full.

In other media
Live action
Street Fighter (1994)

Raúl Juliá played Bison in the 1994 live-action film adaption of the series. Julia perceived Bison in the same vein of villain as Richard III, and approached the role with a Shakespearean tone. In the film, Bison is a British psychopathic drug kingpin and notorious military dictator who controls not only Shadaloo (here depicted as his hostile dictatorship instead of his organization) but also the drug industry with an iron fist. One of his goals in the film is to produce supersoldiers to take over the world and establish a new order known as "Pax Bisonica" using his drug profits. His ambitions have led to a war in Shadaloo with the Allied Nations (AN), led by Colonel Guile, the movie's main character who has been sent to place Bison under arrest for his war crimes. In the film, while Ryu plays a vital role in Bison's downfall by helping to lure Guile to Bison's base, Bison and Ryu do not fight, though at one point, Ryu attempts to fight Bison alongside Ken, Chun-Li, E. Honda and Balrog. In the climax, he fights Guile and very nearly kills him with his uniform's built-in electromagnetism (the film's stand-in for Bison's Psycho Power), but he is defeated when Guile kicks him into his gigantic monitor screen and leaves him to die when the base explodes. A post-credits scene only available on the home-video release shows Bison resurrected through a solar-powered life support machine.

For the role, Raúl Juliá studied the lives and personalities of various dictators and drug lords, and as such mimicked many of their hand movements and body language to incorporate into the M. Bison character, most notably Benito Mussolini's hand gestures, Joseph Stalin's mannerisms and strict demeanor, Adolf Hitler's love of art, and Pablo Escobar's elusiveness. Other dictators and drug lords incorporated by Juliá include Fidel Castro, Muammar Gaddafi, Idi Amin, and Saddam Hussein.

The film was Julia's final role before his death, and a dedication to him is included in the end credits. Julia claimed in an interview that he accepted the role for his children, who were huge fans of the games, helped him prepare for the role and were on set with him each day of filming. Although the film was largely panned by critics and fans, Juliá's performance was widely praised and he was nominated for a posthumous Saturn Award for Best Supporting Actor.

In the Japanese dub of the film, he is still called "M. Bison" as opposed to "Vega", his name in the original Japanese versions of the series, as the film was a mostly American production, and Bison, Balrog and Vega were all named onscreen with their American names.

This version of Bison appears in the arcade game based on the film, Street Fighter: The Movie, as well as in the home video game bearing the same title. In the home version, he is the main antagonist of the Movie Battle mode, and a non-playable super-powered version of him serves as the final boss. He also serves as the final opponent in the Street Battle mode, following Zangief, Dee Jay and Sagat, even if one plays as Bison himself. In his ending, he is said to have crushed Colonel Guile in personal combat and defeated his AN Forces, and subsequently brought the world under the control of his Pax Bisonica empire. In the game, Bison is physically portrayed by Darko Tuscan, who served as Raúl Juliá's stunt double in the film, and cutscenes of Juliá as Bison are shown throughout the game. Out of respect for Juliá, Bison is the only character in the game whose actor is left unnamed.

Pakistani rapper and music producer Adil Omar has also incorporated an M Bison alter-ego inspired by Juliá's portrayal, most notably in his music video for "Mastery". He has also named his Islamabad studio Bisonopolis.

Street Fighter: The Legend of Chun-Li (2009)
Neal McDonough portrayed Bison in Street Fighter: The Legend of Chun-Li. He appears as the main antagonist once again, this time opposite Chun-Li. The film shows Bison donning a business suit rather than his signature costume and is depicted as a crime boss and secret drug kingpin disguised as a Thailand-based multilingual Irish international businessman instead of a military man, although he is also shown to be in charge of his own paramilitary force. In a backstory told by Gen, Bison was abandoned by his Irish missionary parents in Thailand when he was an infant and lived his entire life engaging in acts of theft. He then sacrificed his pregnant wife in the bowels of a supernatural cave, where he imbued his daughter, Rose, with the goodness of his soul, thus ridding himself of any sense of conscience. Bison's raw physical power is seen to borderline on supernatural, as he usually only required one punch or kick to send an opponent hurtling through the air. His power is first exhibited during his introduction where his spiritual energy was so immense, it heralded his arrival by a soft breeze inside Chun-Li's family manor. He is killed at the end of the film in front of his daughter when Chun-Li twists his head around by use of her legs.Bison Cast. IGN. Retrieved on 2008-3-29.

"Shadaloo" as it is referred to, is a multi-leveled criminal syndicate which is a plutarchy of an unknown number of powerful crime families that have connections ranging from the locale mafiosos of the countries to even factions of the government (in the film's current case, the department of commerce). Though Bison's full goals are not divulged, his first order of business is to buy up an entire waterfront district and restructure it specifically for the wealthy and elite, thus further adding to the funding of his operations. He first appears as a simple mob head, only to skyrocket through the ranks after killing off a number of allied families and usurping their power for himself. He is depicted as being uncomfortably upbeat about everything, as he usually reveals shortly afterward that he is in control of almost every element of espionage and intrigue he is involved with. There is a moderately less supernatural background with Bison than there was with his video game and anime counterparts.

Street Fighter: Resurrection
Silvio Simac portrayed Bison in Street Fighter: Resurrection appearing in the final episode observing Ryu, Ken, Laura and Nash through a battered Decapre's eyes while sitting down on his throne behind a massive spherical object before burning a chess piece with his Psycho Power and proclaiming that he shall let them come.

Street Fighter: World Warrior
M. Bison is set to appear in Street Fighter: World Warrior as the primary villain.

Power Rangers: Legacy Wars (Live action short)
Actor Kevin Porter portrays M. Bison in this official crossover between Power Rangers and Street Fighter with the famous YouTube channel "Bat in the Sun" filming and being produced by Hasbro, Allspark Pictures, nWay Games, and Saban as a promotion for the popular mobile game. Also starring Jason David Frank as Tommy Oliver (MMPR Green Ranger, MMPR White Ranger, Zeo Red Ranger, Turbo Red Ranger, Dino Thunder Black Ranger), Ciarra Hanna as Gia Moran (Megaforce Yellow), and Peter Jang as Ryu (RuyRanger).

Animation
Street Fighter II: The Animated Movie
Bison is the main antagonist of the anime film Street Fighter II: The Animated Movie, voiced by Takeshi Kusaka in the Japanese version and Tom Wyner in the English dub with a Trans-Atlantic accent. Bison's organization, Shadaloo (here named "Shadowlaw"), is stated as being an international terrorist organization, employing a great deal of scientific technology, including cyborgs (known as "Monitor Cyborgs") which pose as humans while broadcasting live images to Bison. As in the games, the "M" in his name is not revealed, although his scientist, Senoh, refers to him as "Master Bison". Intrigued by Ryu's fighting skills after seeing him defeat Sagat, Bison orders a nationwide manhunt to capture and brainwash him to work for Shadowlaw, but after failing to locate him, he abducts and brainwashes Ken in his stead, while instructing Vega to assassinate Chun-Li. In the film's climax, Bison enters the battlefield by setting Ken on Ryu and fighting Guile. He defeats but spares Guile as an insult, just as Ken manages to overcome Bison's brainwashing. Bison disposes of Ken and faces Ryu, toying with the warrior when he refuses Bison's offer to work under him for Shadaloo. Ken recovers and Bison fights both Ryu and Ken hand-to-hand, and is defeated when he is struck with a combined Hadoken. Bison survives the attack, however, and reappears in the film's final scene, driving a truck towards Ryu, who prepares to fight Bison again as the film ends.

Street Fighter II V
Bison appears in the second half of the anime series Street Fighter II V. In the ADV Films dub, he is voiced by Markham Anderson and then later on by Mike Kleinhenz, while Tom Wyner reprises his role from the animated movie for the Animaze English dub. In the series, he sports a dark blue uniform instead of his traditional red one. He is still the leader of Shadowlaw, which now has numerous subdivisions, such as the Ashura Syndicate under his associate, Mr. Zochi but has no major history with Guile nor Chun-Li as opposed to other versions. When Ashura is destroyed by Ryu, Ken, Chun-Li, Fei-Long and Inspector Dorai (Chun-Li's father), Bison orders Dorai murdered and Ken kidnapped and held ransom after witnessing him defeat Vega in a very dramatic fashion, and later sends his henchman, Zangief, to capture Ryu, whom Bison had seen on the beach practicing Hadou, and have him brainwashed into becoming his enforcer and surrogate son. In the meantime, Bison succeeds in brainwashing both Chun-Li and Ryu and setting them on Guile and Ken, respectively, after killing Charlie Nash after a botched rescue. In the end, Ken manages to break Bison's control on Ryu, and the two take on Bison. Bison, clearly the superior fighter, easily handles both Ryu and Ken, until they discover that Bison can be damaged with their Hadou powers. Ken is knocked unconscious while Ryu battles on. Bison prepares to finish off Ryu with a Psycho Crusher, but is intercepted by Ken using his Hadou Shoryu. Ken's strength is depleted and Ryu takes on Bison one-on-one, who is still not fully recovered from Ken's attack. Ryu uses a series of moves to defeat a defenseless Bison. As Bison prepares a final Psycho Crusher, Ryu counters with a Hadouken, which hits Bison square in the chest and presumably destroys him.

Street Fighter (US cartoon)
Voiced by Richard Newman, Bison's portrayal in the American Street Fighter animated series is considerably close to his portrayal in both the live-action film and significant aspects of the video game. His primary nemesis is Guile, as in the movie. In the first season, Bison's attack on Chun-Li's village (referenced in the live-action film), appears in a flashback, revealing how he killed Chun-Li's father, who attacked him in futile defiance. Bison later reveals to a vengeful Chun-Li that he also murdered his own father in cold blood. The second season explored Bison's relationship with Cammy in the same manner as the games and the anime movie, with Cammy being triggered as a "sleeper agent" in the opening episodes. She discovers that Bison had murdered her parents after discovering they were MI5 agents and brainwashed her into becoming a sleeper agent in the series finale, but not before she reestablishes her romantic bond with him. Bison seems to worship a Thai deity that instructs him on what to do with his resources, and in the finale, Bison convinces himself he has been told to destroy the Earth through the launching of nuclear missiles. Bison eventually engages Guile in a showdown which concludes when Guile, in a manner reminiscent of the 1994 film, kicks Bison into a computer and fires a sonic boom at him, unleashing a strong magnetic force that pulls Bison into the computer, which explodes afterwards, destroying him completely.

Street Fighter (UDON comics)
Bison is heavily featured as the primary antagonist of the UDON-published Street Fighter comic series. His story is mostly unchanged from the official version, portraying him as the dark and sinister leader of Shadaloo. He operates behind a veil of various agents and associates who do his bidding as well as having numerous enemies (such as Chun-Li and Guile). Bison is the student of a mysterious woman whose tribe has mastered the art of Soul Power. After being exiled from further training, he studies the forbidden texts of their people and learns the nature of Psycho Power, the negative half of Soul Power. He returns to her later in life and uses this power to massacre his mentor's tribe, leaving only one survivor (Rose). Like the official story, Bison has a great interest in Ryu after watching him defeat Sagat at the last Street Fighter tournament and observing the nature of the Satsui no Hadō. At the end of the first series of comics, Bison is defeated in a battle with his own creation (Charlie, who had been empowered with Shadaloo technology) when Charlie sacrifices himself to plunge Bison into a river. Bison survives the fall and his body is reanimated with the Psycho Drive, whereupon he resumes his role as Shadaloo dictator. As the comic moves forward, Bison announces his "Street Fighter II" tournament, the second global gathering of martial artists, and is documented in the Street Fighter II Turbo series of comics. The tournament itself runs smoothly up until what would have been the final battle between Ryu and Bison. At this point, Akuma intervenes (much like the official story) and demands a fight with Ryu. Bison senses the amount of great power Akuma carries and attempts to subdue him in combat, only to be halted by Rose's spirit who restrains him while Akuma delivers the final blow and seals Bison's soul for good.

Wreck-It Ralph
M. Bison makes a cameo appearance in the Disney film Wreck-It Ralph with Gerald C. Rivers reprising his role from Street Fighter IV onwards. He and Zangief appear as members of the villain support group Bad-Anon. During a meeting, he sits between Clyde, Doctor Eggman and Bowser. When Ralph contemplates rebelling against his programming as a villain to become a hero, Bison warns him against it, asking if he is "going Turbo", referencing how notorious racing game character Turbo crashed RoadBlasters out of jealousy, resulting in both of their games being unplugged.

Shadaloo
Shadaloo, named Shadowlaw in early localizations, is a fictional crime organization that is run by Bison. Its insignia is a winged skull with a lightning bolt—forming an "S" for Shadaloo—etched onto its forehead. The symbol can be seen on Bison's cap from Champion Edition onwards, as well as in numerous cutscenes. The Four Main members of Shadaloo are Balrog, Vega, Sagat, and Bison himself. Balrog and Vega were recruited by Bison with the promise of massive wealth, whereas Sagat was motivated to join by the prospect of revenge for his defeat at the hands of Ryu in the first Street Fighter tournament. In Street Fighter II, Bison ostensibly hosts the game's fighting tournament to seek out new talent for Shadaloo. Bison's end sequence in Super Street Fighter II sees him establish a new world order.

Bison and Shadaloo feature more prominently in the Alpha series of games. New Shadaloo henchmen are introduced, including the Dolls, a group of female fighters who are programmed to serve Bison. Cammy was bred as a member of this group, but eventually broke from the group and fled to England. The character Birdie joins Shadaloo during his ending sequence in the first Street Fighter Alpha game, but turns against Bison and leaves in Alpha 2.

In Street Fighter Alpha 3, Bison's headquarters is located in the interior of a Thai statue depicting a female deity. During the game over sequence, the face of the statue crumbles away, revealing a skull-like robotic head. The robot's eyes fire a laser into the stratosphere, which is intercepted by Bison's satellite and deflected back toward Earth.

In Street Fighter EX, C. Jack is a member of Shadaloo who seeks to escape the organization. In his ending in the first game, he derails a Shadaloo train.

In Street Fighter II: The Animated Movie, Shadaloo (here named Shadowlaw) plays out the same role as in the game series. In the film, a politician named Ed Pressman (named after one of the producers of the 1994 live action film) is mentioned as secretly working with Shadowlaw and running for President of the United States to make M. Bison ruler of the country in all but name. In the English dub, however, it is implied that Bison is merely a figurehead for Pressman, who is referred to as Shadowlaw's true master. Pressman's fate after Bison's defeat and Shadowlaw's fall is unknown.

In Street Fighter II V, Shadowlaw is shown with various subdivisions, one of which is known as Ashura, operating primarily in Hong Kong under Mr. Zochi, who himself answers to Bison. Ashura is destroyed by Ryu, Ken, Chun-Li and Fei-Long, which brings them into conflict with Shadowlaw later in the series. Shadowlaw is also shown to have moles and spies in various organisations, such as when Balrog is shown infiltrating the FBI and secretly reporting to Bison. Shadowlaw's fate after Bison's defeat is unknown.

In Street Fighter Alpha: The Animation, the organisation is not present, but the villain, Dr. Sadler, is said to have connections with Shadowlaw.

In the 1994 live-action Street Fighter film, "Shadaloo City" is a fictional location and a hostile dictatorship under General M. Bison, here depicted as a drug kingpin and war criminal opposed by the Allied Nations led by Guile. According to maps shown during the film's opening, it is a fictitious country located in a segment of present-day Burma in Southeast Asia. It can be surmised, from a song sung by Bison's soldiers and two posters ("ĝeneralo Bison", "teroristo"), that the official language of Shadaloo is Esperanto. Despite this, Bison still surrounds himself with fighters to serve as bodyguards, most notably Zangief and Dee Jay, and later inducts Sagat, Vega, Ryu and Ken (though the latter two are infiltrating the organization to help Guile track Bison down). Bison's nationality is not revealed in the film, although it can be assumed that he is British, given his use of a perfect English accent and his desire to conquer England first after defeating Guile and the Allied Nations. In the video game adaptation of the film, Bison is fought as the last of the Four Grand Masters, though succeeded by Zangief, Dee Jay and Sagat instead of Balrog (who is a protagonist) and Vega (a minor antagonist).

In the 2009 live-action film Street Fighter: The Legend of Chun Li, Shadaloo (in this case, Shadowlaw) was a major crime syndicate operating out of (but not limited to) Bangkok, Thailand dealing mainly with narcotics, extortion, and several legal fronts such as high priced commercial and residential real-estate. Bison (portrayed by Neal McDonough) rose to power of this organization by hiring Vega to decapitate all the other shareholders to the company, and then later placed their heads on a platter to be discovered by interpol agent Charlie Nash. Bison's appearance in this film is severely altered as well being changed to that of a blonde haired, blue eyed Irish immigrant to Thailand due to his parents being religious missionaries to that country.

Reception
Since he appeared in Street Fighter II, M. Bison has received mostly positive reception. IGN ranked Bison fourth on its list of the "Top 25 Street Fighter Characters", praising his role as a villain in the series that did not rely solely on his henchmen. IGN would also list him as the 19th best video game villain, describing him as a formidable boss and one who has endured for years as a mainstay in the Street Fighter series. GameSpot listed him at number five on its "Top 10 Video Game Villains" list, stating a preference for his attack set while bemoaning his portrayal in the live action film. He was also featured in GameSpot's Top Ten Boss Fights with editors describing him as "cheap." GamePro placed him at number thirty in its "47 Most Diabolical Video-Game Villains of All Time" article, stating "This guy had the nerve to look you dead in the face, threaten your very soul and then tell you he represents an organization called Shadaloo. That's brave, man." Guinness World Records Gamer's Edition listed M. Bison as 17th in their list of top 50 Villains. GameDaily named Bison one of its favorite Capcom characters of all time, calling him "one of the best end bosses ever." It later listed Bison at number five on their "Top 20 Street Fighter Characters of All Time" article, describing him as "One of the most vile, powerful end bosses ever put into a video game". He was also 2nd in GamesRadar's "The 12 most misunderstood videogame villains" with comments on the various sub-stories Bison is involved in the Street Fighter series. UGO Networks placed M. Bison at #14 on their list of Top 50 Street Fighter Characters", stating "Bison is the second (Street Fighter's last boss was Sagat) and only true villain in the series. Other bosses in the series are motivated by one thing or another, but Bison's true goal is to oppress the world for his own selfish benefit." 1UP.com listed him as of the characters they wanted to see in Street Fighter X Tekken. Complex ranked M. Bison as the "45th Coolest Video Game Villain of All Time", as the "24th Hardest Video Game Boss", as the "5th Best Street Fighter Character", as the "3rd Most Dominant Fighting Game Character", his boss battle in Street Fighter Alpha 3 as the "4th Coolest Boss Battle", and his Psycho Punisher as the "12th Most Revolutionary Killing Move in Video Games", and "6th Coolest Fighting Game Super Combo", while Prima Games ranked it as the "9th Greatest Fighting Move in Video Game History." Den of Geek ranked M. Bison as the "13th Best Street Fighter Character", with comments "Bison is so sinister that he literally made himself purely evil through magic just so he wouldn’t be distracted by his conscience. He’s just so infectiously cheery about being an absolute dirtbag. It’s hard not to get behind his one-liners that bring out his zest for kung-fu treachery." Arcade Sushi ranked him as the "20th Best Video Game Villain", adding "M. Bison would always be there, ready to unleash his “Psycho Power” on anyone foolish enough to challenge him." In their rankings of Street Fighter characters, Paste placed M. Bison at 29th place, commenting "He’s not empathetic or nuanced. Bison is the Saturday morning cartoon villain of the Street Fighter series, and for the most part, it works." Digital Spy named him the "9th Best Street Fighter Character", stating "Bison is a great villain because of the many individual rivalries he has with the heroes of the universe. He has wronged so many people on a personal level to the point where he is irredeemable." GamesRadar named M. Bison as one of the hardest fighting game bosses, commenting "In that context--the fighting game genre's infancy--M. Bison was one of the most infuriating opponents imaginable." In 2014, Capcom UK named M. Bison the "4th Most Powerful Street Fighter Character", while in 2016, Screen Rant named M. Bison the "3rd Most Powerful Street Fighter Character", stating "As the main antagonist of the series, it’s only natural M. Bison would also be one of the most powerful characters of the franchise—he’s even proven capable of getting the better of Ryu." GamesRadar'' staff described M. Bison as the best villain in video games, stating that "Vega, Master Bison, Dictator - no matter what you call him, anyone who harnesses the destructive might of Psycho Power energy has got to be bad news."

References

 

Action film characters
Action film villains
Capcom antagonists
Dictator characters in video games
Fictional criminals in video games
Fictional crime bosses
Fictional generals
Fictional Asian martial arts practitioners
Fictional mass murderers
Fictional terrorists
Fictional warlords in video games
Male characters in video games
Male video game villains
Street Fighter characters
Power Rangers characters
Video game bosses
Video game characters introduced in 1991
Video game characters who can teleport
Video game characters who have mental powers
video game supervillains
Film supervillains
Male film villains